Sergei Olegovich Yeshchenko (born 1 March 2001) is a Russian football player. He plays for FC Kuban Krasnodar.

Club career
He made his debut in the Russian Football National League for FC Krasnodar-2 on 4 October 2020 in a game against FC Nizhny Novgorod.

On 15 December 2021, he joined FC Fakel Voronezh on loan until the end of the season.

On 23 June 2022, Yeshchenko signed a one-year contract with FC Kuban Krasnodar.

References

External links
 Profile by Russian Football National League
 

2001 births
Sportspeople from Krasnodar Krai
Living people
Russian footballers
Russia youth international footballers
Association football goalkeepers
FC Krasnodar-2 players
FC Fakel Voronezh players
FC Urozhay Krasnodar players
Russian First League players
Russian Second League players